James Curry, (born October 26, 1957) was a defensive tackle who played seven seasons in the Canadian Football League.  He won Grey Cups in 1983 with the Toronto Argonauts and 1989 with the Saskatchewan Roughriders--his first and last seasons in the league.

Following his retirement, he was a colour commentator for the CFL on CBC.

References

Canadian football defensive linemen
Canadian Football League announcers
BC Lions players
Toronto Argonauts players
Ottawa Rough Riders players
Saskatchewan Roughriders players
Nevada Wolf Pack football players
Players of American football from California
1957 births
Living people
People from Madera County, California